Fort Finney was a fort built in Oct. 1785 at the mouth of the Great Miami River near the modern city of Cincinnati and named for Major Walter Finney who built the fort.  The site was chosen to be midway between Falls of the Ohio and Limestone (Maysville), two early settlements on the Ohio River.  Earlier, George Washington had commissioned Generals George Rogers Clark, Richard Butler and Samuel Parsons to make a peace treaty with the Shawnee Indians, and a fort was needed to secure the territory.  A company under Major Finney was dispatched in fall, 1785 from Fort Pitt to build the fort.

The fort was abandoned sometime before the Symmes Purchase in 1788. Today, the site is the coal yard of the Miami Fort Power Station.

Treaty of Fort Finney

The Treaty of Fort Finney, also known as the Treaty at the Mouth of the Great Miami, was signed on January 31, 1786 at Fort Finney near modern day Cincinnati between the United States and Shawnee leaders after the American Revolutionary War, ceding parts of the Ohio country to the United States. The treaty was reluctantly signed by the Shawnees, and later renounced by other Shawnee leaders. The Northwest Indian War soon followed.

See also
Treaty of Fort Stanwix (1784)
Treaty of Fort McIntosh

External links
"Treaty of Fort Finney (1786)". Ohio Historical Society. Ohio History Central: An Online Encyclopedia of Ohio History, 2005.
http://www.ohiohistorycentral.org/entry.php?rec=447
http://www.graphicenterprises.net/html/shawnee_lookout_05.html
http://www.graphicenterprises.net/html/shawnee_lookout_06.html

1786 in the United States
Northwest Indian War
Shawnee history
Fort Finney
Fort Finney
Fort Finney
1785 establishments in the United States